Adscita albanica is a moth of the family Zygaenidae. It has a disjunct distribution, which included south-eastern France, Switzerland (Kanton Wallis), in Italy, Slovenia, North Macedonia, Albania, Bulgaria, Greece, Ukraine, the southern part of European Russia and the Caucasus.

Adults are on wing from the end of May (the Crimea) to mid June (Albania and Switzerland). They feed on the flower nectar of Geranium species.

The larvae feed on Geranium sanguineum. Pupation takes place in a white cocoon in the soil near the food plant.

References

C. M. Naumann, W. G. Tremewan: The Western Palaearctic Zygaenidae. Apollo Books, Stenstrup 1999,

External links

 Lepiforum e. V.
Adscita albanica images at  Consortium for the Barcode of Life
 pyrgus.de
 Adscita albanica (Naufock, 1926)

Procridinae
Moths described in 1926
Moths of Europe